Egle Oddo (Palermo, 1975) is an Italian visual artist residing in Helsinki, Finland.<ref
name="one">
S.Low 2010.</ref>

Biography
She is a graduate of Palermo's Academy of Fine Arts, and has worked in Cuba, England, France, Finland, Germany, Italy, Nicaragua, Spain, Sweden, and Russia. She has won several prizes, including the Premio Felice Casorati,<ref
name="three"> Piemonte Arte 2010.</ref><ref
name="ten"> Archivio Casorati.</ref> In 2012, she was chosen to participate in the Venice Biennale, Italian Pavilion in the World.
Her work focuses on narrative as an art form, combining different media, performative elements and the investigation of social interaction.<ref
name="six"> Comunicare Italia "Genio Italiano nel Mondo: l’arte italiana in Finlandia alla 54a Biennale di Venezia" by Maria Stella Bottai.</ref>

In the years 2003-2009, she was part of La Sala Naranja,<ref
name="four"> Photography Now, "Egle Oddo".</ref> an art collective that was founded by the art critic Toni Calderòn with the purpose of discovering and promoting artists. In 2006, she founded the Namastic art collective together with Toni Ledentsa and Virva Sointu, its function is to promote exchanges between Finnish artists and other art organizations. In the same year, she, along with Anu Miettinen and Anastasia Eliseeva, founded LARU Environmental Art, a non-profit organization that presents yearly art exhibitions, performances and workshops in Helsinki.

She has exhibited in Luova.fi Gallery,<ref
name="eight"> Luova.fi "Five Short Stories".</ref> Baltic Biennale,<ref
name="seven"> Baltic Biennale 2010 Catalogue.</ref> LARU art, and an extract of her book Le Superfici Piane was chosen by the writer Giorgio Vasta for the literary web-blog Nazione Indiana.<ref
name="five"> Nazione Indiana "Cattimatti".</ref>

References

External links
Instagram.

Italian artists
Living people
1975 births
Italian expatriates in Finland